Friedrichstadt is a town in the district of Nordfriesland, in Schleswig-Holstein, Germany. It is situated on the river Eider approx. 12 km south of Husum.

History 
The town was founded in 1621 by Dutch settlers. Duke Friedrich III of Holstein-Gottorp persuaded them to invest capital and knowledge in this region in turn for freedom of their Mennonite and Remonstrant religion (see: Arminianism) and opportunities to reclaim fen and marsh land in the vicinity of the town. One of them was Johannes Narssius. Dutch became an official language. The town was named after Duke Frederick.

By 1630, many Arminians had already returned to the Netherlands. In 1633-1637 Frederick III sent an embassy to Tsar Michael I of Russia and to Shah Safi of Persia  with a view to setting up Friedrichstadt as a European trade terminus. The delegation was led by the jurisconsult Philip Crusius, jurisconsult, and the merchant Otto Bruggemann or Brugman, of which their secretary - the scholar Adam Olearius - later wrote a book. However, the aim of creating a regular trading route that would not pass around Africa was not achieved, and the delegation proved fruitless. Altogether, the city of Friedrichstadt did not become as successful as anticipated.

Beside the Remonstrants and Mennonites there were also other faith communities as Unitarians, Quakers, Catholics and Jews.

Personalities

Sons and daughters of the city 
 Benjamin Calau (1724-1785), visual artist
 Eduard Alberti (1827-1898), literary historian
 Wilhelm Mannhardt (1831-1880), scholar and folklorist
William Thordsen (1879-1932), US Navy Medal of Honor recipient
Norbert Masur (1901-1971), subcontractor of the Jewish World Congress

Connected to Friedrichstadt
 Jürgen Ovens (1623-1678), Rembrandt pupil and court painter of the dukes of Schleswig-Holstein-Gottorf, lived here and is buried in St. Christophorus Church
 Louis Philippe I (1773-1850) lived a few months in the flight from the French Revolution Place and worked under a blanket as a home teacher
 Hjalmar Schacht (1877-1970), German politician, banker, Reichsbank president and Reichswirtschaftsminister, his grandparents lived here

Images

References

External links
In search of the Dutch origin of Friedrichstadt and the surrounding polderlands, including walking tour
Friedrichstadt's official homepage.

Populated places established in 1621
Nordfriesland
1621 establishments in the Holy Roman Empire